Yasiel Puig Valdés (born December 7, 1990) is a Cuban-born American professional baseball right fielder who is a free agent. He has played in Major League Baseball (MLB) for the Los Angeles Dodgers, Cincinnati Reds, and Cleveland Indians, and in the KBO League for the Kiwoom Heroes. His nickname is "The Wild Horse", given to him by former longtime Dodgers broadcaster Vin Scully. 

Puig previously played for the Cuba national baseball team in the 2008 World Junior Baseball Championship, winning a bronze medal. He defected from Cuba in 2012, and signed a seven-year, $42 million contract with the Dodgers. He made his MLB debut on June 3, 2013. In 2013, Puig hit .319 in 104 games with 19 home runs, and was selected by Baseball America to their annual "All-Rookie team". The Dodgers traded Puig to the Reds before the 2019 season, and the Reds traded Puig to the Indians at the 2019 trade deadline.

Puig did not sign with a team in 2020, and played for El Águila de Veracruz of the Mexican League in 2021. He signed with the Heroes for the 2022 season.

Early life
Puig was born in Cienfuegos, Cuba, the elder of two children of Omar Puig and Maritza Valdés. He has a sister, Yaima. His father was an engineer in a sugar cane factory. He began playing baseball at the age of nine.

Cuban career
Puig played for the Cuba national baseball team when they won the bronze medal in the 2008 World Junior Baseball Championship. He then played for the Cienfuegos team of the Cuban National Series in the 2008–09 Cuban National Series. He batted .276 with five home runs in his debut season. Puig enjoyed a breakout season in the 2009–10 Cuban National Series, with a .330 batting average, 17 home runs, 47 runs batted in (RBIs), and 78 runs scored in 327 at-bats. Puig also played for the Cuba national team in the 2011 World Port Tournament, where he tried to defect along with teammate Gerardo Concepción. Concepción was successful; Puig was not. He was penalized disciplined by a ban from playing the 2011–12 seasons.

Defection from Cuba to Mexico
Starting in 2009, Puig tried to defect to Mexico 13 times in order to become a legal resident so he could become eligible to sign a contract in Major League Baseball. The first time, the police pulled over Puig's car. The second time, the boat failed to arrive. The third time, police raided their safe house and detained them for six days. On the fourth try, the U.S. Coast Guard Cutter Vigilant intercepted their boat near Haiti. The fifth time, he was successfully taken to Mexico by Los Zetas, a murderous Mexican drug cartel involved in cocaine and smuggling. Yunior Despaigne, a boxer who was formerly on the Cuba national team and had known Puig for years through youth sports academies, said:

"I don't know if you could call it a kidnapping, because we had gone there voluntarily, but we also weren't free to leave. If they didn't receive the money, they were saying that at any moment they might give him a machetazo" — a whack with a machete — "chop off an arm, a finger, whatever, and he would never play baseball again, not for anyone."

Floridian Raul Pacheco, the 29-year-old president of Miami-based T&P Metal and PY Recycling, allegedly paid smugglers $250,000 to get Puig out of Cuba. In exchange, Pacheco would receive 20% of Puig's future earnings after he signed an MLB contract. Pacheco had previously been arrested in 2009 for attempted burglary and in 2010 for using a fake Bank of America credit card to buy $150,000 worth of beer and having in his possession four other fraudulent credit cards and a fake ID card. He was sentenced to two years’ probation. Puig had also been offered to Los Angeles-based agent Gus Dominguez, starting at $175,000, and New York-based agent Joe Kehoskie, starting at $250,000. "Nobody's going to Cuba and bringing out a guy like Yasiel Puig," Kehoskie said, "and just handing him over to an agent out of the goodness of their heart."

A month later, the captain of the smuggling boat, Yandrys León, was found dead in Cancún. León was called "one of the most important capos of the Cuban-American mafia" by the United Press International. Cuban boxer Miguel Angel Corbacho Daudinot was sentenced to seven years in prison after Puig allegedly testified against him to the Cuban authorities. In 2013, Corbacho Daudinot's lawyers filed a federal lawsuit against Puig in Miami, claiming that Puig delivered false testimony that led to Corbacho Daudinot's imprisonment under "inhumane" conditions, and in so doing violated the Torture Victim Protection Act; the suit seeks $12 million in damages.

According to court records, Puig has paid Pacheco over $1.3 million. He also paid $400,000 to $500,000 to Alberto Fariñas, the 49-year-old vice president of Pacheco's T&P Metal company, and $600,000 to Marcos González, a Miami lawyer. He also paid an undisclosed amount to Gilberto Suarez, founder of a start-up company called Miami Sport Management.

American career

Minor leagues
The Los Angeles Dodgers signed Puig on June 28, 2012, to a seven-year deal worth $42 million. Eddie Oropesa and Tim Bravo, a special-education teacher from Las Cruces High School in New Mexico, helped the newly arrived Puig adjust to life in the United States during his first year. The Dodgers placed him on the 40-man roster and assigned him to their Arizona Rookie League team. In nine games, he hit .400 with four homers and 11 RBI.

On August 13, 2012, the Dodgers promoted Puig to the Rancho Cucamonga Quakes of the Class A-Advanced California League. He played in 14 games with the Quakes and hit .327. After the Quakes season, he was scheduled to join the Mesa Solar Sox of the Arizona Fall League, but a staph infection in his right elbow required surgery and sidelined him for several months. After the infection healed, he opted to play winter ball in Puerto Rico to keep his development on schedule.

Puig had a very strong spring training with the Dodgers in 2013, hitting .526 in Cactus League games and having some in the press speculate that he might break camp with the Dodgers. However, he was optioned to the Chattanooga Lookouts of the Class AA Southern League just before the end of spring training. He hit .313 with eight home runs and 37 RBI for the Lookouts in 40 games.

Los Angeles Dodgers

2013

On June 2, 2013, the Dodgers announced that they had recalled Puig from Chattanooga, and he made his debut on June 3. In his first career at-bat, he singled to left-center off Eric Stults of the San Diego Padres. He was 2-for-4 in the game, and showcased his strong arm by recording an outfield assist on a double play to end the game.

Puig hit two home runs, doubled, and drove in five runs in his second game. He became the first Dodger ever to have a multi-homer game in one of his first two appearances. In his fourth game, on June 6, 2013, he hit a grand slam off of Cory Gearrin of the Atlanta Braves. Puig was named the National League Player of the Week for the week of June 3–9.

Puig had 27 hits in his first 15 games, tied with Joe DiMaggio (1936) and Terry Pendleton (1984) for second-most all-time behind Irv Waldron (1901) and Bo Hart (2003) with 28. He also became the first player in major league history to record at least 34 hits and seven home runs in his first 20 games and set Dodger records for most hits through 20 games (one more than Gibby Brack in 1937) and total bases through 20 games (58, four more than Del Bissonette in 1928). Puig finished the month of June with 44 hits, breaking Steve Sax's 1983 team record for most hits by a rookie in one month. That total was also second all-time for rookies in their first month, behind only DiMaggio who had 48. In 26 games in June, Puig hit .436 with a .467 on-base percentage and a .713 slugging percentage. He won both the National League Rookie of the Month Award and the National League Player of the Month Award, the first time someone had won both in their first month in the Majors.

Despite his not making his debut until June, Puig received 842,915 write-in votes from the fans for the 2013 All-Star Game. His name was included among the All-Star Final Vote candidates. Puig received 15.5 million votes, second to Atlanta Braves' first baseman Freddie Freeman who received 19.7 million.

In 2013, Puig hit .319 in 104 games with 19 home runs and 42 RBIs. He was selected by Baseball America to their annual "All-Rookie team" and finished second in the National League Rookie of the Year voting to fellow Cuban José Fernández.

2014

On May 17, 2014, Puig had his eighth consecutive game with at least one extra-base hit and at least one RBI, which was a new record for the longest streak by a Dodger, surpassing the marks of Pedro Guerrero (1985), Duke Snider (1954), and Howie Schultz (1944). He was selected as the NL Player of the Week for that week and the National League Player of the Month for May after he hit .398 with eight home runs and 25 RBI. Puig was voted and named a starter for the 2014 All-Star Game, the youngest Dodger starter for an All-Star game since Steve Sax in 1982. Puig participated in the Home Run Derby during the All-Star festivities.

On July 25, 2014, Puig went 4-for-5 with a career-high four extra-base hits, tying the Dodgers' single-game record with three triples, matching Jimmy Sheckard. Puig's teammates Matt Kemp and Dee Gordon each recorded one triple as well, tying the club's single-game triples record of five, set in 1902 and 1921.

Puig finished the 2014 regular season with 16 home runs and 69 RBI, and a .296 batting average. In the 2014 NLDS against the St. Louis Cardinals, Puig struck out seven times in a row over the first three games of the series. He then hit a triple and scored the Dodgers' only run in a 3–1 loss.

Puig was selected to travel to Japan after the season with a team of MLB All-Stars playing against All-Stars of Nippon Professional Baseball in the 2014 Major League Baseball Japan All-Star Series.

2015 

Puig began the 2015 season experiencing left hamstring issues that caused him to miss several games. On April 26, Puig was placed on the 15-day disabled list for the first time in his major league career, due to his nagging left hamstring. He rejoined the Dodgers roster on June 6. On August 18, Puig injured his right hamstring, and he was placed on the 15-day disabled list nine days later. He returned on October 3, appearing in the final two games of the season. He played in a total of 79 regular-season games. He batted .255/.322/.436, and he had 11 home runs, 38 RBIs, and three stolen bases — all career lows.

2016
In the 2016 season, Puig was again hampered by hamstring issues which reduced his playing time and production. He hit .260 with seven home runs in 81 games through the end of July. On August 2, he was optioned to the AAA Oklahoma City Dodgers when the Dodgers acquired Josh Reddick in a trade to take over the right field position. ESPN reported that Puig was told by the team on Monday, August 1, the day of the trade deadline not to join the Dodgers on the road since he would either be traded or demoted. He rejoined the team in September and hit .263/.323/.416 on the season in 104 games with 11 home runs and 45 RBIs. He batted .211 (4-for-19) with a run scored in 10 postseason games.

2017
On June 13, 2017. Puig made an obscene gesture at Cleveland Indians fans at Progressive Field after hitting a home run. The next day, he was suspended for a game, but he appealed the suspension and it was rescinded. He instead was allowed to make a charitable donation. For the season, he batted .263/.346/.487 with 28 home runs (a career high) and 74 RBI, as well as 15 stolen bases. He received the Wilson Defensive Player of the Year Award for his play in right field. He had a strong start to the postseason, hitting .455 in the 2017 NLDS and .389 with a home run in the 2017 NLCS. In the 2017 World Series, he had only four hits in 27 at-bats (.148 average) as the Dodgers lost the series in seven games to the Houston Astros. Two of his four hits were home runs.

2018
On February 7, 2018, Wasserman Media Group announced that it had "terminated its professional relationship" with Puig. He was without representation until April 2018, when he signed with Beverly Hills Sports Council. On April 28, Puig left a game due to left hip soreness. The injury occurred while he was making a catch against the outfield wall. He was placed on the 10-day disabled list the next day. On August 11, Puig hit his 100th career home run off Kyle Freeland of the Colorado Rockies. On August 14, Puig got into an altercation with Nick Hundley at home plate. After fouling off a pitch, Puig threw his bat up and snatched it out of the air in frustration feeling like he had a good pitch to hit. Hundley took exception to Puig's actions and the two had words. Puig then shoved Hundley, causing a bench-clearing brawl. Both Hundley and Puig were ejected. In 2018, he had the lowest fielding percentage among all Major League right fielders. In Game 7 of the NLCS Puig hit a 3-run home run to extend the Dodger lead to 5–1 against the Milwaukee Brewers. In Game 4 of the 2018 World Series, Puig hit a 3-run home run off Eduardo Rodriguez to increase the Dodgers' lead to 4–0. 

Throughout the season, Puig struggled against left-handed pitching.

Cincinnati Reds
On December 21, 2018, the Dodgers traded Puig to the Cincinnati Reds, along with Matt Kemp, Alex Wood, Kyle Farmer, and cash considerations in exchange for Homer Bailey, Jeter Downs, and Josiah Gray.
 Puig was involved in bench-clearing brawls in each of two Reds losses to the Pittsburgh Pirates. The first one in the top of the fourth inning of a 7–5 defeat at PNC Park on April 7, 2019, resulted in an ejection and a two-game suspension for extending hostilities. The second brawl was just under four months later on July 30 in the top of the ninth of an 11–4 loss at Great American Ball Park, minutes after news broke that he was going to be traded to the Cleveland Indians.

Cleveland Indians

The three-team transaction sending Puig to the Indians became official the following day on July 31, 2019. The Reds acquired Trevor Bauer from Cleveland, the Indians acquired Scott Moss from Cincinnati and Franmil Reyes, Logan Allen, and Victor Nova from San Diego, and the Padres acquired Taylor Trammell. On August 1, 2019, Puig was suspended for three games due to his role in a brawl during a game against the Pittsburgh Pirates while playing for the Reds. He did not appeal the suspension, which he served starting on August 12, 2019, against the Boston Red Sox.

El Águila de Veracruz
On July 17, 2020, Puig tested positive for COVID-19, nixing a deal he was expected to sign with the Atlanta Braves.

On April 21, 2021, Puig announced via Twitter that he had signed with El Águila de Veracruz of the Mexican League. In 62 games with the team, Puig batted .312/.409/.517 with 10 home runs and 43 RBIs across 247 plate appearances. He was named as the Defensive Player of the Year following the season.

Kiwoom Heroes
On December 8, 2021, Puig signed a one-year, $1 million contract with the Kiwoom Heroes of the KBO League.

Personal life
Puig has four sons.

On August 14, 2019, Puig became a United States citizen.

Philanthropy 
Puig created the Wild Horse Children's Foundation in 2016. The foundation's name embraces the nickname Vin Scully gave him as a rookie. According to its website, the foundation aims to inspire children and families in underserved communities by promoting healthier and better-quality lives through education, sports, community development, and health and wellness programs.

On April 19, 2018, Puig and the Wild Horse Children's Foundation announced a collaboration with the City of San Fernando, California to renovate Pioneer Park, as well as refurbish a dilapidated house on-site that had been boarded up for nearly 10 years.

At a game in New York City in May 2019, Puig met a young fan about to have his 40th surgery, due to hydrocephalus. The following month, Puig treated the fan and his family to a Reds game in Cincinnati.

On an off-day in New York between two Indians' series (one with the Mets and one with the Yankees) in August 2019, Puig paid for a helicopter trip to Camp Simcha, an orthodox Jewish day camp for kids with cancer. He spent four hours with the children there, and found it difficult to leave. In a tweet afterward, Puig called it "one of the best days of my life", adding, "you are my inspiration".

Legal issues
In April 2013, Puig was charged with reckless driving and speeding in Chattanooga, Tennessee, when he was caught driving  in a  zone on Amnicola Highway. The charges were dismissed after he served 12 hours of community service. On December 28, 2013, Puig was again arrested for reckless driving after allegedly driving  in a  zone, in Naples, Florida. He was taken to the Collier County Jail and released after posting bail. The State of Florida elected to drop the reckless driving charge on January 28, 2014, after concluding that there was insufficient evidence to support it.

In March 2021, ESPN reported that MLB investigators had interviewed a woman who said Puig had sexually assaulted her in a Staples Center bathroom during a Los Angeles Lakers game in October 2018. Puig has denied the allegations, calling them "false and malicious". The woman did not file a police report, but later filed a lawsuit. In October 2021, Puig announced that he had settled his sexual assault lawsuit, and wished to return to MLB in 2022.

As part of the disclosure from the 2020 lawsuit, Puig's attorneys claimed that Puig was insolvent, and that his earlier wealth from his successful career was nearly completely gone. The latest settlement was for $250,000 — with the accuser paying her own attorney's fees — due to fears that Puig had nothing left to offer had the accuser held out for more.

In December 2021, it was reported in The Washington Post that Puig had secretly settled a lawsuit raised by two women who claimed that Puig sexually assaulted them in January 2017. Despite the allegations, Puig had not been put on leave, and the public had not been notified.

In November 2022, Puig pled guilty to lying to federal law enforcement officers regarding bets that he placed with an illegal sports betting operation. He faces up to five years in prison. Later that month, he changed his plea to not guilty.

See also
 List of baseball players who defected from Cuba

References

External links

Cuban Baseball Career statistics 

 
 

1990 births
Living people
Arizona League Dodgers players
Chattanooga Lookouts players
Cincinnati Reds players
Cleveland Indians players
Defecting Cuban baseball players
El Águila de Veracruz players
Elefantes de Cienfuegos players
Cuban expatriate baseball players in Mexico
Indios de Mayagüez players
Cuban expatriate baseball players in Puerto Rico
Cuban expatriate baseball players in South Korea
KBO League right fielders
Kiwoom Heroes players
Los Angeles Dodgers players
Major League Baseball players from Cuba
Cuban expatriate baseball players in the United States
Major League Baseball right fielders
National League All-Stars
Oklahoma City Dodgers players
People from Cienfuegos
Rancho Cucamonga Quakes players
Toros del Este players
Cuban expatriate baseball players in the Dominican Republic
Naturalized citizens of the United States